Grammage and basis weight, in the pulp and paper industry, are the area density of a paper product, that is, its mass per unit of area. Two ways of expressing grammage are commonly used:
 Expressed in grams (g) per square metre (g/m2), regardless of its thickness (caliper). This is the measure used in most parts of the world. It is often notated as gsm on paper product labels and spec sheets.
 Expressed in terms of the mass per number of sheets of a specific paper size, known as basis weight. The convention used in the United States and a few other countries using US-standard paper sizes is pounds (lb) per a ream of 500 (or in some cases 1000) sheets of a given (raw, still uncut) basis size.  Japanese paper is expressed as the weight in kilograms (kg) per 1,000 sheets.

Grammage
In the metric system, the mass per unit area of all types of paper and paperboard is expressed in terms of grams per square metre (g/m2 or gsm). This quantity is commonly called grammage in both English and French, though printers in most English-speaking countries still refer to the "weight" of paper.
                            

Typical office paper has , therefore a typical A4 sheet ( of a square metre) weighs . The abbreviation "gsm" instead of the standard "g/m2" symbol is also widely encountered in English-speaking countries.

Typically grammage is measured in paper mill on-line by a quality control system and verified by laboratory measurement.

Basis weight
In countries that use American paper sizes, a less verifiable measure known as basis weight is used in addition to or instead of grammage. The basis weight of paper is the density of paper expressed in terms of the mass of a ream of given dimensions and a sheet count. In the US system, the weight is specified in avoirdupois pounds and the sheet count of a paper ream is usually 500 sheets. However, the mass specified is not the mass of the ream that is sold to the customer. Instead, it is the mass of the uncut "basis ream" in which the sheets have some larger size (parent size). Often, that is a size used during the manufacturing process before the paper is cut to the dimensions in which it is sold. So, to compute the mass per area, one must know
 the mass of the basis ream,
 the number of sheets in that ream, and
 the dimensions of an "uncut" sheet in that ream.

The standard dimensions and sheet count of a ream vary according to the type of paper. These "uncut" basis sizes are not normally labelled on the product, are not formally standardized, and therefore have to be guessed or inferred somehow from trading practice. Historically, this convention is the product of pragmatic considerations such as the size of a sheet mold.

By using the same basis sheet size for the same type of paper, consumers can easily compare papers of differing brands. Twenty-pound bond paper is always lighter and thinner than 32-pound bond, no matter what its cut size, and 20-pound bond letter size and 20-pound bond legal size papers are the same weight paper with a different cut size.

However, a sheet of common copy paper that has a basis weight of  does not have the same mass as the same size sheet of coarse paper (newsprint). In the former case, the standard ream is 500 sheets of  paper, and in the latter, 500 sheets of  paper. Here are some basic ream sizes for various types of paper. Units are inches except where noted.

{| class="wikitable"
|-
!Paper type
!colspan="2"|Paper size(inches)
!Sheets per ream
|-
|Bond, writing, ledger        ||style="border-right: none;"|17 ||style="border-left: none;"|× 22 ||500
|-
|Manuscript cover             ||style="border-right: none;"|18 ||style="border-left: none;"|× 31 ||500
|-
|Blotting                     ||style="border-right: none;"|19 ||style="border-left: none;"|× 24 ||500
|-
|Box cover                    ||style="border-right: none;"|20 ||style="border-left: none;"|× 24 ||500
|-
|Cover                        ||style="border-right: none;"|20 ||style="border-left: none;"|× 26 ||500 or 1000
|-
|Watercolor                   ||style="border-right: none;"|22 ||style="border-left: none;"|× 30 ||500
|-
|Bristol and tag              ||style="border-right: none;"|||style="border-left:none;"|×  ||500
|-
|Tissue                       ||style="border-right: none;"|24 ||style="border-left: none;"|× 36 ||480
|-
|Newsprint                    ||style="border-right: none;"|24 ||style="border-left: none;"|× 36 ||500
|-
|Hanging, waxing, bag, etc.   ||style="border-right: none;"|24 ||style="border-left: none;"|× 36 ||500
|-
|Book, text, offset           ||style="border-right: none;"|25 ||style="border-left: none;"|× 38 ||500
|-
|Index bristol                ||style="border-right: none;"|||style="border-left: none;"|×  ||500
|-
|Paperboard (all types)       ||style="border-right: none;"|12 ||style="border-left: none;"|× 12 ||1000 ( per ream)
|}

Sheets  can be cut into four  sheets, a standard for business stationery known conventionally as letter sized paper. So, the  ream became commonly used. The  book-paper ream developed because such a size can easily be cut into sixteen  book sized sheets without significant waste (nominally  before trimming and binding).

Early newsprint presses printed sheets  in size, and so the ream dimensions for newsprint became , with 500 sheets to a ream. Newsprint was made from ground wood pulp, and ground wood hanging paper (wallpaper) was made on newsprint machines. Newsprint was used as wrapping paper, and the first paper bags were made from newsprint. The newsprint ream standard also became the standard for packaging papers, even though in packaging papers kraft pulp, rather than ground wood, was used for greater strength.

Paper weight is sometimes stated using the "#" symbol. For example, "20#" means "20 pounds per basis ream of 500 sheets". When the density of a ream of paper is given in pounds, it is often accompanied by its "M weight". The M weight is the weight (in pounds) of 1000 cut sheets. Paper suppliers will often charge by M weight, since it is always consistent within a specific paper size, and because it allows a simple weight calculation for shipping charges.

For example, a 500-sheet ream of 20#  copy paper may be specified "10 M". 1000 cut sheets (or two reams) will weigh , half of the four reams of cut paper resulting from the 20# basis ream of  paper.

Caliper
Paper thickness, or caliper, is a common measurement specified and required for certain printing applications. Since a paper's density is typically not directly known or specified, the thickness of any sheet of paper cannot be calculated by any method. Instead, it is measured and specified separately as its caliper. However, paper thickness for most typical business papers might be similar across comparable brands. If thickness is not specified for a paper in question, it must be either measured or guessed based on a comparable paper's specification.

Caliper is usually measured in micrometres (μm), or in the United States also in mils (1 mil =  in = 25.4 μm).

The paper density is calculated by dividing the grammage over the caliper, and is usually expressed in grams per cubic centimetre (g/cm3) to cancel out the mathematical need for unit conversions between metres and micrometres (a conversion factor of 1,000,000).

See also
 Density
 Area density
 Linear density

 Envelope size
 Hole punch — filing holes
 Index card
 Paper and ink testing
 Photo print sizes

References

External links
 Paper Weight - Conversion Chart
 Understanding Paper Weights
 Understanding paper weight (Staples, Inc.)
 M-weight Calculator
 Paper Weight Calculator
 Paper Weight Conversion GSM to LBS

Paper
Printing